Santa Rosa de Quives  is a district in the middle of Canta Province, Lima Region in Peru. It is bordered by Carabayllo District on the west, Huamantanga District on the north, Lachaqui and Arahuay districts on the east, and Carabayllo District and Huarochirí Province on the south. 
It is most known because is the place where the house of Santa Rosa de Lima, a very famous religious figure in Peru, is located. There is also the so-called Quives's water well where people can leave their letters to Santa Rosa de Lima.

External links
  Municipalidad Provincial de Santa Rosa de Quives 
  Santa Rosa de Quives Tour